Bull or Buffalo racing ("Kala or Pothu poottu matsaram") is an agricultural spectator sport held in Kerala, India for thousands of years.

References
 
 

Culture of Kerala
History of Kerala
Sport in Kerala
Animal racing
Traditional sports of India